Tillandsia guelzii is a species in the genus Tillandsia. It is endemic to Jujuy Province of northern Argentina.

References 

Flora of Argentina
Plants described in 1988
guelzii